Haakon Olsen Wika (1 July 1899 – 11 February 1981) was a Norwegian politician for the Labour Party.

He was born in Vega.

He was elected to the Norwegian Parliament from Nordland in 1937, and was re-elected on one occasion.

Wika was a member of Vega municipality council from 1928 to 1947, and then served as mayor from 1947 to 1966. He was also a long-time member of Nordland county council.

References

1899 births
1981 deaths
People from Vega, Norway
Labour Party (Norway) politicians
Members of the Storting
20th-century Norwegian politicians